This was the first edition of the tournament.

Nicolás Barrientos and Alejandro Gómez won the title after defeating Martín Cuevas and Rafael Matos 6–3, 6–3 in the final.

Seeds

Draw

References

External links
 Main draw

Florianópolis Challenger - Doubles